The "LSU Alma Mater" was written in 1929 by Lloyd Funchess and Harris Downey, two students who developed the original song and music because LSU's first alma mater was sung to the tune of "Far Above Cayuga's Waters" and was used by Cornell University. The band plays the "Alma Mater" during pregame and at the end of each home football game. Also, members of the band join arm-in-arm at the end of rehearsals on Saturday game days and sing the "Alma Mater" before leaving the practice facility.

Lyrics

References

External links
 

Alma Mater
Alma Mater
American college songs
Alma mater songs
Institutional songs
1929 songs